Hans Kollwitz (14 May 1892 – 22 September 1971) was a German epidemiologist, eldest son of artist Käthe Kollwitz. He obtained his degree in medicine and psychotherapy in 1928. He was also a World War I veteran, in which he voluntarily served, after joining from the German Youth Movement where he was a Wandervogel.

Biography 

Hans was born to Karl Kollwitz (1863–1940) and artist Käthe Kollwitz (1867–1945). At the outbreak of World War I, Hans voluntarily joined the Imperial German Army and served in the war. His younger brother Peter, was killed in action in 1914 in Belgium.

In 1920 he married Otthilie Ehlers (1900–1963), who, like his mother, was also a graphic artist. Among other things, she also illustrated children's books and made woodcuts and wood engravings of predominantly East Prussian landscapes. Together they had one son Peter (1921–1942) and two daughters, Jutta and Jordis in 1923 and son Arne in 1930. His son Peter was killed in action in 1942 in World War II on the Eastern Front in Russia at the age of 21. He had been named in memory of Hans's younger brother, who died at the age of 18 in World War I.

After his graduation, he moved to Lichtenrade, which was particularly hard hit by air raids on Nazi Germany on 3 December 1943. The house of the Kollwitz family was badly damaged and was no longer habitable afterwards.

He never joined the Nazi Party and served in the health administration after World War II.

Publications 
Beitrag zur Kenntnis der Insuffizientia vertebrae. Med. Diss., o. V., Berlin 1920. 
Käthe Kollwitz. Tagebuchblätter und Briefe. ebr. Mann, Berlin 1948. 
Käthe Kollwitz. Bertelsmann, Gütersloh 1956. Hrsg.: Werner Schumann
Käthe Kollwitz: Aus meinem Leben. List, München 1958. 
Käthe Kollwitz 1867–1945. Briefe der Freundschaft und Begegnungen. List, Munich 1966. 
Käthe Kollwitz (1867–1967). Inter Nationes, Bad Godesberg 1967. 
Käthe Kollwitz. Das plastische Werk. Fotos von Max Jacoby. Mit einem Vorwort von Leopold Reidemeister. Wegner, Hamburg 1967. 
Käthe Kollwitz. Ich sah die Welt mit liebevollen Blicken. Ein Leben in Selbstzeugnissen. Fackelträger-Verlag Schmidt-Küster, Hannover 1968.

References 

1892 births
1971 deaths
German Army personnel of World War I
Käthe Kollwitz
German epidemiologists
German psychotherapists
Physicians from Berlin